Lifted is a 2006 American computer-animated short science fiction film written and directed by Gary Rydstrom and produced by Pixar Animation Studios. This is the directorial debut of Rydstrom, a seven-time Academy Award-winning sound designer, editor and mixer, and the first produced by Katherine Sarafian, who went on to produce Pixar's Brave released in 2012.

Inspired by Metropolis (1927), the short premiered on October 12, 2006 at the 42nd Chicago International Film Festival at Columbia College, and was released theatrically with Pixar's Ratatouille on June 29, 2007.

Plot 
A young alien named Stu, is inside a spacecraft taking an alien abduction test. He must snatch a sleeping farmer named Ernie under the watchful eye of his impassive examiner, a gelatinous blob named Mr. B. Working from memory, Stu is expected to use an array of thousands of identical unlabeled toggle switches for this purpose; Mr. B's neutral expression gives no hints of which ones to use.

Stu's hesitant flicks of the switches turn out to be wrong, causing Ernie to bump into the walls and ceiling, albeit without waking him up. As Stu grows increasingly frustrated, Stu yells and swipes randomly at the array. Ernie bounces randomly around the room like a pinball, knocking over the furniture in the process but remaining asleep. Eventually, after checking his notes, Stu does succeed in maneuvering Ernie out the window and up into the ship, but he shuts off the tractor beam without closing the cargo hatch. As Ernie plummets toward the ground, Mr. B takes over and catches him, he then pushes Stu far away from him and starts working the switches with incredible speed to put him back in his bed and clean up the mess Stu created.

Dejected over his failure, Stu struggles to hold back tears. With a sigh, the sympathetic Mr. B allows him to launch the spaceship for the trip home. Stu cheerfully grabs the steering yoke and begins to maneuver; a moment later the ship slams to the ground, crushing Ernie's house. When it lifts off, its underside is covered with dirt and debris, and nothing is left of the house except a tall pillar of dirt in the center of a crater, cut out by the open cargo hatch. Atop this, Ernie is still sound asleep in bed.

As the end credits run, the sound of Ernie's alarm clock is heard, followed by his yawn, a scream and a thud – indicating that he has fallen into the crater.

Production 
Production on the film began in mid-2005 and was completed in the summer of 2006. There were no large technological advances used in Lifted, only the use of a new program called Jiggle. This program gives the animators a way to resonate, or jiggle, certain parts of a body. The animator can control how far out to resonate, such as only within a limb, or to stay away from specific parts of the body such as the face.

Awards 
Lifted was nominated for Best Animated Short Film on January 23, 2007 for the 79th Academy Awards. It was also included in the Animation Show of Shows in 2006.

Blu-ray and DVD release
Pixar included the film on the Blu-ray and DVD release of Ratatouille and as part of Pixar Short Films Collection, Volume 1 in 2007.

See also

Metropolis – Is inspired by the Sci-Fi movie released in 1927.
List of science fiction films of the 2000s

References

External links 
 
 
 
 

2006 computer-animated films
2006 short films
2000s American animated films
2000s animated short films
2000s science fiction comedy films
Alien abduction films
American animated science fiction films
American science fiction comedy films
Animated films without speech
Animated films about extraterrestrial life
Films scored by Michael Giacchino
Films directed by Gary Rydstrom
Pixar short films
2006 comedy films
Films produced by Katherine Sarafian
American animated short films